Martin A. Klein (born 1934 in suburban New York City) is an Africanist and an emeritus professor in the History Department at the University of Toronto specialising in the Atlantic slave trade, and francophone West Africa: Senegal, Guinea, and Mali. He obtained a Bachelor of Arts degree in journalism at Northwestern University (1951-1955) and a Master of Arts and Doctor of Philosophy  in history at the University of Chicago (1957-1964). Klein worked as an Assistant Professor at the University of California Berkeley from 1965 till 1970, later teaching African history at the University of Toronto as an associate professor and later full professor from 1970 until his retirement in 1999. As a Fulbright Fellow, Klein taught for a year at Lovanium University in Kinshasa.

He was a president of the African Studies Association (US, 1991-1997) and of the Canadian Association of African Studies. In 2001, Klein received a Distinguished Africanist Award from the African Studies Association. In 2010, the American Historical Association awarded the first annual Martin A. Klein Prize instituted in his name for the most distinguished work of scholarship on African history published in English during the previous calendar year.

Publications
Klein published many scholarly articles, books and book chapters, including:
 Islam and imperialism in Senegal; Sine-Saloum, 1847-1914, Stanford University Press for the Hoover Institution on War, Revolution, and Peace, Stanford, California, 1968.
 'Slavery, the slave trade, and legitimate commerce in late nineteenth-century Africa', Cahiers d'Études africaines, 2 (1971), 5-28, Louvain.
 'Social and Economic Factors in the Muslim Revolution in Senegambia', The Journal of African History, 13 (1972) 419 - 441.
 with Claire C. Robertson, Women and Slavery in Africa, University of Wisconsin Press, Madison, Wisconsin, 1983.
 Breaking the Chains: Slavery, Bondage and Emancipation in Modern Asia and Africa, University of Wisconsin Press, Madison, Wisconsin, 1993.
 Slavery and Colonial Rule in French West Africa, Cambridge University Press 1998. African Studies Book 94.
 Historical dictionary of slavery and abolition (The A to Z of slavery and abolition), Scarecrow Press, Lanham, Maryland, 2002.
 with Alice Bellagamba and Sandra E. Greene, The bitter legacy : African slavery past and present, Markus Wiener Publishers, Princeton, 2013.
 'Urban Slavery in West and West Central Africa during the Transatlantic Slave Trade', Journal of African Diaspora Archaeology and Heritage, 10 (2020) 1-20.

References

External link
 . Video of a lecture by Klein. Uploaded by Science4Peace on 4 November 2015. Duration 1h:05m:01s.

1934 births
American Africanists
Historians of Africa
Historians of slavery
Living people
Academic staff of Lovanium University
Medill School of Journalism alumni
University of Chicago alumni
Academic staff of the University of Toronto